Rathwell is an unincorporated urban centre in the province of Manitoba. It is part of the agricultural area of south central Manitoba, Canada and is situated in the Municipality of Norfolk Treherne.

Climate

References

External links
 Manitoba Community Profiles
 Rathwell, Manitoba

Unincorporated communities in Central Plains Region, Manitoba